Logan Vander Velden (born April 3, 1971) is an American former professional basketball player. He was a member of the 1995–96 Los Angeles Clippers team for 15 games. Born in Valders, Wisconsin, Vander Velden attended high school in his home town, and played basketball for the Green Bay Phoenix at the University of Wisconsin–Green Bay.

References 

1971 births
Living people
American expatriate basketball people in Chile
American expatriate basketball people in Portugal
American expatriate basketball people in Venezuela
Basketball players from Wisconsin
Connecticut Pride players
Fort Wayne Fury players
Gaiteros del Zulia players
Green Bay Phoenix men's basketball players
Los Angeles Clippers players
People from Manitowoc County, Wisconsin
Small forwards
Undrafted National Basketball Association players
American men's basketball players